Towle (formerly, Towles) is an unincorporated community in Placer County, California. It lies at an elevation of 3694 feet (1126 m).

History
The name honors George and Allen Towle, local lumbermen. The Towle post office operated from 1891 to 1935.

Notable person
Katherine Amelia Towle (1898-1986), United States Marine Corps officer and educator, was born in Towle.

References

Unincorporated communities in California
Unincorporated communities in Placer County, California